Bertella idiomorpha is a species of deep-sea anglerfish found in the northern Pacific Ocean. It is the only species in the genus Bertella, in the family Oneirodidae, and can be distinguished from other members of the family by the structure of its hyomandibular bone.

Distribution and habitat
Specimens of B. idiomorpha have only been collected in the northern Pacific Ocean, including off Japan, in the Bering Sea, and in the Gulf of California. The depths ranged from 580 m to 3475 m.

Description
Like other oneirodids, B. idiomorpha is a small, globular-bodied fish with a large head and jaws, and a bioluminescent lure (esca) on a stalk (illicium) attached to the head. The skin is scaleless and covers the base of the caudal fin. There are numerous small, rounded, darkly pigmented papillae on the head, body, and tail, associated with the lateral line system. The fish is dark brown to black in color, except for the clear tips of the papillae and the end of the esca. The jaws are filled with slender, straight teeth. The females measure up to 8.4 cm in length. Only one male is known, an 11-mm specimen attached to a 77-mm female. B. idiomorpha is unique amongst the oneirodids in having a hyomandibular bone (the bone that attaches the lower jaw to the cranium) with a single head. In its family, B. idiomorpha most resembles the genus Dolopichthys, differing in having a wider and deeper skull, shorter and fewer jaw teeth, and in details of the mandibular spines and the esca.

Biology and ecology
In contrast to the closely related Dolopichthys, which feeds on fish and squid, B. idiomorpha feeds on amphipods, krill, and small decapods. This difference in prey items is reflected in the body shape of B. idiomorpha, which is shorter and deeper, suggesting that it is a more sluggish swimmer than Dolopichthys. B. idiomorpha also has smaller and fewer teeth, and its single-headed hyomandibular bone reduces the strength of its bite, again consistent with preying on smaller, slower prey items.

B. idiomorpha and Leptacanthichthys gracilispinis are the only oneirodids known to have parasitic males. Both the tips of the upper and lower jaws of the male B. idiomorpha become fused to the female. Small openings to the mouth and opercular cavities of the male are maintained on both sides. Mature female B. idiomorpha contain around 7500 eggs per ovary, and have some of the largest eggs amongst the deep-sea anglerfish.

References

Oneirodidae
Fish of the Gulf of California
Taxa named by Theodore Wells Pietsch III
Fish described in 1973